Electronic literature or digital literature is a genre of literature encompassing works created exclusively on and for digital devices, such as computers, tablets, and mobile phones. A work of electronic literature can be defined as "a construction whose literary aesthetics emerge from computation", "work that could only exist in the space for which it was developed/written/coded—the digital space". This means that these writings cannot be easily printed, or cannot be printed at all, because elements crucial to the text are unable to be carried over onto a printed version. As Di Rosario et al. 2021 note "Electronic literature is a digital-oriented literature, but the reader should not confuse it with digitized print literature."

Definitions
N. Katherine Hayles defines electronic literature as "'digital born' (..) and (usually) meant to be read on a computer", clarifying that this does not include e-books and digitised print literature. A definition offered by the Electronic Literature Organization (ELO) states electronic literature "refers to works with an important literary aspect that takes advantage of the capabilities and contexts provided by the stand-alone or networked computer". This can include hypertext fiction, animated poetry (often called kinetic poetry) and other forms of digital poetry, literary chatbots, computer-generated narratives or poetry, art installations with significant literary aspects, interactive fiction and literary uses of social media.

The definition of electronic literature is controversial within the field, with strict definitions being criticised for excluding valuable works, and looser definitions being so murky as to be useless. Scott Rettberg argues that an advantage of a wide definition is its flexibility, which allows it to include new genres as new platforms and modes of literature emerge.

History

1950s
The first literary works for digital media were written by computer scientists. Christopher Strachey's love letter generator, written for the Manchester Mark 1 computer in 1952, is probably the first example of electronic literature. This is an example of combinatory poetry, also called generative poetry.

1960s 
Joseph Weizenbaum programmed the chatbot ELIZA in 1966, establishing a new genre of conversational literary artefacts or bots.

1970s 
In 1975–76, Will Crowther programmed a text game named Colossal Cave Adventure (also known as Adventure). Considered one of the earlier computer adventure games, it possessed a story that had the reader make choices on which way to go. These choices could lead the reader to the end, or to his or her untimely death. This non-linear format was later mimicked by the text adventure game, Zork, created by a group of MIT students in 1977–79. These two games are considered to be the first examples of interactive fiction as well as some of the earliest video games.

1980s 
The eighties were a time of experimentation, but the field was not connected enough for people to be aware of each other. Bp Nichol published "First Screening: Computer Poems" written in BASIC in 1984. Judy Malloy published Uncle Roger on The WELL in 1986/87. Michael Joyce's Afternoon, a story was demonstrated at a conference, and was then published by Eastgate Systems.

Digital artists also created works with strong literary components that have had an influence on the field of electronic literature. An example is Jeremy Shaw's The Legible City (1989).

1990s 
The "Storyspace school" characterised the early 1990s, consisting of works created using Storyspace, software developed by Jay David Bolter and Michael Joyce in the 1980s. They sold the software in 1990 to Eastgate Systems, a small software company that has maintained and updated the code in Storyspace up to the present.  Storyspace and similar programs use hypertext to create links within text. Literature using hypertext is frequently referred to as hypertext fiction. Originally, these stories were often disseminated on discs and later on CD. Hypertext fiction is still being created today using not only Storyspace, but other programs such as Twine.

Key works from this period include Stuart Moulthrop's Victory Garden, Shelley Jackson's Patchwork Girl (1995) and Deena Larsen's work.

Towards the end of the decade, authors began writing on the web. Scott Rettberg, William Gillespie, Dirk Stratton, and Frank Marquadt's sprawling hypertext novel The Unknown won the trAce/Alt-X Hypertext Competition in 1998. It was also featured in the Electronic Literature Collection Vol. 2, and has been analysed by a number of scholars.

The Electronic Literature Organization was founded in 1999 by Scott Rettberg, Robert Coover and Jeff Ballowe, and is still active today, with annual conferences, online discussions and publications.

2000s

In Japan, cell phone novels became popular from the early 2000s. Similar genres emerged in other countries where text messaging was well-established, including India and Europe.

In North America the web was becoming the main platform for electronic literature. Caitlin Fisher's These Waves of Girls (2001) was a hypermedia novella telling stories of girlhood, using images and sounds as well as links and text. Talan Memmott's Lexia to Perplexia (2000) offered complex visual and textual layers that sometimes confuse and occlude themselves, and is described by Lisa Swanstrom as a "beautifully intricate piece of electronic literature".

Kate Pullinger's Inanimate Alice is an example of a work that began as a web novel and then saw versions across several media, including a screenplay and a VR experience. Works like The Impermanence Agent, by Noah Wardrip-Fruin and collaborators, explored the web's ability to customise a story for the reader.

An analysis of 44 PhD dissertations about electronic literature published between 2002 and 2013 found a clear shift in the genres referenced by the authors of the dissertations during this period. Between 2002 and 2008, the referenced works clustered in four distinct genre groups: interactive fiction, generative literature, classic hypertext fiction (mostly published on disk or in print) and web hypertexts, including more experimental works and some poetry.

2010s 
The spread of smartphones and tablets led to literary works that explored the touchscreen, such as Samantha Gorman and Danny Cannizarro's Pry (2014) or Kate Pullinger's Breathe: A Ghost Story.

Netprov, improvisational and collaborative networked writing was another genre that developed during the 2000s and 2010s. Instapoetry, a visual style of poetry native to Instagram became a popular success.

As machine learning made rapid advances with natural language processing and deep learning, authors began to experiment and write with the AI. David Jhave Johnston's ReRites is an example of a poetic work written as a human-AI collaboration.

Dissertations published between 2009 and 2013 still cite many works in the genres of hypertext fiction, interactive fiction, experimental webtexts and generative texts, but digital poetry also emerged as a significant genre, with dissertation authors writing about two distinct clusters of digital poetry: kinetic poetry and poetic installations in art galleries. Many of these works were from the 1980s to the early 2000s, so this may indicate an uptake in scholarly interest rather than a large change in what kinds of creative works were actually published in the 2010s.

Scholarship

Hypertext and cybertext 
Digital literature tends to require a user to traverse through the literature through the digital setting, making the use of the medium part of the literary exchange. Espen J. Aarseth wrote in his book Cybertext: Perspectives on Ergodic Literature that "it is possible to explore, get lost, and discover secret paths in these texts, not metaphorically, but through the topological structures of the textual machinery". Espen Aarseth defines "ergodic literature" as literature where "nontrivial effort is required to allow the reader to traverse the text".

Historical research 
Various histories of electronic literature and its subgenera have been written. Scott Rettberg's Electronic Literature provides a broad overview, while more specialised books discuss the history of specific genres or periods, like Chris Funkhouser's Prehistoric Digital Poetry and Astrid Ensslin's Pre-web Digital Publishing and the Lore of Electronic Literature.

Leonardo Flores proposes a generational understanding of electronic literature, where the first generation is pre-web, the second uses the web, and the third generation uses social media, web APIs and mobile devices. However, not all works fit within this structure, as Spencer Jordan notes, writing that "A work such as The Unknown, for example, sits uneasily between second and third generation definitions."

Preservation and archiving

Electronic literature, according to Hayles, becomes unplayable after a decade or less due to the "fluid nature of media". Therefore, electronic literature risks losing the opportunity to build the "traditions associated with print literature". On the other hand, classics such as Michael Joyce's afternoon, a story (1987) are still read and have been republished on CD, while simple HTML hypertext fictions from the 1990s are still accessible online and can be read in modern browsers.

Several organizations are dedicated to preserving works of electronic literature. The UK-based Digital Preservation Coalition aims to preserve digital resources in general, while the Electronic Literature Organization's PAD (Preservation / Archiving / Dissemination) initiative gave recommendations on how to think ahead when writing and publishing electronic literature, as well as how to migrate works running on defunct platforms to current technologies.

The Electronic Literature Collection is a series of anthologies of electronic literature published by the Electronic Literature Organization, both on CD/DVD and online, and this is another strategy in working to make sure that electronic literature is available for future generations.

The Maryland Institute for Technologies in the Humanities and the Electronic Literature Lab at Washington State University Vancouver also work towards the documentation and preservation of electronic literature and hypermedia.

Databases and directories 

 The Electronic Literature Knowledge Base (ELMCIP) is a research resource for electronic literature, with 3,851 entries as of September 2, 2022.
The Electronic Literature Organization's Next Museum hosts 38 collections of digital art and writing as of September 2, 2022.
 The Electronic Literature Directory
 NT2: Le laboratoire de recherche sur les oeuvres hypermédiatiques
 African Electronic Literature Alliance & African Diasporic Electronic Literature (AELA & ADELI)

See also
List of electronic literature authors, critics, and works
Cybertext
Digital poetry
Generative art (section Literature)
Hypermedia
Interactive fiction
Literatronica

References

Further reading

Bolter, Jay David. Writing Space: Computers, Hypertext, and the Remediation of Print, Second Edition. Mahwah: Lawrence Erlbaum Associates,  2001.
---. Remediation: Understanding New Media. Cambridge: MIT Press, 1999.
Ciccoricco, David. Reading Network Fiction. Tuscaloosa: University of Alabama Press, 2007.
Gendolla, Peter; Schäfer, Jörgen (eds.). The Aesthetics of Net Literature. Writing, Reading and Playing in Programmable Media. Bielefeld (Germany): Transcript, 2007.
Glazier, Loss Pequeño. Digital Poetics: the Making of E-Poetries. Alabama, 2002.
Hansen, Mark B. N. Bodies in Code: Interfaces With Digital Media. Routledge, 2006.
---. New Philosophy For New Media. Cambridge: MIT Press, 2004.
 Hayles, N. Katherine. Electronic Literature: New Horizons for the Literary. Notre Dame: University of Notre Dame Press, 2008. http://newhorizons.eliterature.org
---. My Mother Was a Computer: Digital Subjects and Literary Texts. Chicago: University of Chicago Press, 2005.
---. Writing Machines. Cambridge: MIT Press, 2002.
Landow, George. Hypertext 3.0: Critical Theory and New Media in an Era of Globalization (Parallax: Re-visions of Culture and Society), 2005
---.Hypertext 2.0: The Convergence of Contemporary Critical Theory and Technology (Parallax: Re-visions of Culture and Society), 1997
---.Hypertext: The Convergence of Contemporary Critical Theory and Technology (Parallax: Re-visions of Culture and Society), 1991
---.Hyper/Text/Theory, 1994
 Manovich, Lev.The Language of New Media, MIT Press, Cambridge Mass, USA, 2001.
 Moulthrop, Stuart. You Say You Want a Revolution: Hypertext and the Laws of Media. Postmodern Culture, v.1 n.3 (May, 1991).
 Pressman, Jessica.  "The Strategy of Digital Modernism:  Young-hae Chang Heavy Industries' Dakota," Modern Fiction Studies 54(2); 302-26.
 Schäfer, Jörgen; Gendolla, Peter (eds.). Beyond the Screen. Transformations of Literary Structures, Interfaces and Genres. Bielefeld (Germany): Transcript, 2010.
 Simanowski, Roberto; Schäfer, Jörgen; Gendolla, Peter (eds.). Reading Moving Letters. Digital Literature in Research and Teaching: A Handbook. Bielefeld (Germany): Transcript, 2010.
 Tabbi, Joseph.  "On Reading 300 Works of Electronic Literature: Preliminary Reflections." On The Human: A Project of the National Humanities Center.  July 22, 2009.
---. "Locating the Literary in New Media." Contemporary Literature  (Summer 2008). Also online at http://www.electronicbookreview.com/thread/criticalecologies/interpretive.
 Thacker, Eugene (ed.). Hard_Code: Narrating the Network Society, Alt-X Press, 2001.
 Wark, McKenzie. "From Hypertext to Codework," Hypermedia Joyce Studies, vol 3, issue 1 (2002).
 Hispanic Electronic Literature Institutional web of the Biblioteca Virtual Miguel de Cervantes about hypertext and multimedia fiction.
 Wikipedia Literatura Electronica Hispanica in Wikipedia.es
 Strehovec, Janez. Text as Ride. Electronic Literature and New media Art. Morgentown: West Virginia University Press (Computing Literature book series), 2016.

 
Literary genres
New media